Warraq is the Arabic word for stationer or papermaker. Meanings in traditional and Islamic contexts include scribe, publisher, printer, notary and book-copier. Ibn Warraq is a pseudonym that has traditionally been adopted by dissident authors throughout the history of Islam.

Arabic words and phrases
Islamic terminology